The pibiones or grain weaving technique is most commonly found in the central and eastern areas of Sardinia, Italy. This is a particular type of stitched relief, where the pattern is formed from the countless grains incorporated into the cloth during weaving. These are made by twisting the weft yarn around a needle which is arranged in a horizontal position on the loom; after the thread is beat into place, the needle is then pulled away, leaving behind a raised effect (grains).

Pibiones are used to decorate traditional Sardinian linen bedcovers, historically woven by young Sardinian girls to be included in their dowry.

References

Textile arts